Ol' Blue Eyes Is Back is a 1973 studio album by American singer Frank Sinatra.

Sinatra returned from his brief retirement with Ol' Blue Eyes Is Back. Released amidst a whirlwind of publicity, the album was a commercial success, earning gold status and peaking just outside the top-ten on the UK and Billboard album charts.

The album was accompanied by a television special, Magnavox Presents Frank Sinatra, which reunited Sinatra with Gene Kelly.

Genuine first pressings of the LP came with a bonus photo of Sinatra inside the cover.

Track listing
"You Will Be My Music" (Joe Raposo) – 3:52
"You're So Right (For What's Wrong in My Life)" (Victoria Pike, Teddy Randazzo, Roger Joyce) – 4:03
"Winners" (Theme from Maurie) (Raposo) – 2:50
"Nobody Wins" (Kris Kristofferson) – 5:10
"Send in the Clowns" (From A Little Night Music) (Stephen Sondheim) – 4:10
"Dream Away" (From the MGM film The Man Who Loved Cat Dancing) (John Williams, Paul Williams) – 4:22
"Let Me Try Again" ("Laisse-moi le temps") (Paul Anka, Sammy Cahn, Michel Jourdan) – 3:31
"There Used to Be a Ballpark" (Raposo) – 3:34
"Noah" (Raposo) – 4:22

Charts

Certifications

Personnel
 Frank Sinatra– vocals
 Gordon Jenkins– arranger, conductor
 Don Costa– arranger, conductor

See also
 Ol' Yellow Eyes Is Back – a 1991 album by actor Brent Spiner
 Ol' Brown Ears Is Back – a 1993 album by puppeteer Jim Henson as the Muppet character Rowlf the Dog

References

1973 albums
Frank Sinatra albums
Reprise Records albums
Albums arranged by Gordon Jenkins
Albums arranged by Don Costa
Albums produced by Don Costa